T.I.M.E. (The Inner Mind's Eye) is the second and final studio album by Long Island hip hop group Leaders of the New School, released on October 12, 1993, by Elektra Records. This effort didn't fare as well as their debut album, A Future Without a Past..., garnering a mixed reception. After the album's release, the group began having both creative and personal problems, resulting in their disbandment. Singles from the album include "Time Will Tell", "Classic Material", and "What's Next", which peaked at number one on the Billboard Hot Rap Singles chart.

Background
Elektra Records A&R Dante Ross revealed that aside from internal conflict, another thing that caused the group to disband was their insistence to release T.I.M.E. (The Inner Mind's Eye), against Ross' objections:

When Leaders of the New School turned in their second album it was bad – from me to you, it wasn't a good record. I tried to change the record, make it better. They went back in the studio, had to do it again. It wasn't working. Busta though, I knew was a star. Busta was killing it on the 'Scenario' remix, and when we went to make the second Leaders of the New School record I had Q-Tip ready to help me make the whole record with them, like the way he did for Mobb Deep's album. None of them dude's were with it except Bus, and I saw right there that Bus is smarter than these dudes – he's thinking. I'm gonna be honest with you, making that record – when they turned it in the first time, and I knew it was wack and I sent back in – I told Chris Lighty and Lyor Cohen, 'It's time to think about Busta doin' a solo record.' In the interim of that record comin' out, 'Flava in Ya Ear' [remix] came out, so I was verified that he was a star to me. I knew the record was bad, that when they turned it in the second time I couldn't make it no better – they would not let me. I was like, 'Yo, put the record out, it's not gonna perform but let's get Busta thinkin' solo deal'. And that’s what happened.

Critical reception

The Source critic dream hampton called the album "a rarity in hip-hop—a sophomore album that is better than the debut", further stating, "you can't help waiting for Busta to get on the mic." Stanton Swihart of AllMusic described it as "an endlessly interesting listen", concluding that "T.I.M.E. is a much more mature work, both musically and lyrically" than A Future Without a Past....

Track listing

 Unreleased tracks "Emotional" and "Oooh Baby" were left off the album.

Chart positions

Album

Singles

References

1993 albums
Leaders of the New School albums
Elektra Records albums